The 2023 Prince Edward Island general election will be held to elect the members of the 67th General Assembly of Prince Edward Island on 3 April 2023. The election normally required by 2 October under Prince Edward Island's fixed election date legislation was called early by Premier Dennis King at his nomination meeting on 6 March.

Background
Prince Edward Island's fixed election date legislation calls for a general election to be held prior to the first Monday of October in the fourth calendar year subsequent to the previous general election, which would have required an election to be held by 2 October. Instead, the election was called early for April 3.

Timeline
23 April 2019: General election held. The Progressive Conservative Party wins the most seats, while the incumbent Liberal Party fall to third place. The Green Party becomes the Opposition.
26 April 2019: Outgoing Premier Wade MacLauchlan announces intention to resign leadership of the Liberal Party upon appointment of an interim leader.
8 May 2019: Robert Mitchell is appointed interim Liberal leader.
9 May 2019: Dennis King's Progressive Conservative government is sworn in, following the resignation of Wade MacLauchlan's Liberal government.
13 June 2019: Deferred election date announced for Charlottetown-Hillsborough Park.
6 July 2019: Advance voting in Charlottetown-Hillsborough Park deferred election began, also took place on 8 and 12 July.
15 July 2019: Charlottetown-Hillsborough Park deferred election held, Progressive Conservative candidate Natalie Jameson is elected.
9 September 2019: Robert Mitchell resigns as interim Liberal leader.
16 September 2019: Sonny Gallant is appointed interim Liberal leader.
1 September 2020: Joe Byrne resigns as leader of the NDP.
3 September 2020: Charlottetown-Winsloe Liberal MLA and former interim Liberal Party leader Robert Mitchell resigns his seat.
2 November 2020: Charlottetown-Winsloe by-election held. Progressive Conservative candidate Zack Bell is elected, giving the governing PC party a majority of 14 seats in the Legislature.
18 August 2021: Cornwall-Meadowbank Liberal MLA Heath MacDonald resigns to run in Malpeque in the 2021 Canadian federal election.
15 November 2021: Cornwall-Meadowbank by-election held. Progressive Conservative candidate Mark McLane wins, increasing the PC government's majority in the Legislature.
23 April 2022: Michelle Neill is elected leader of the New Democratic Party of Prince Edward Island.
19 November 2022: The Prince Edward Island Liberal Party leadership election took place. Sharon Cameron, as the only candidate to enter the race by the close of nominations, was declared leader.
6 March 2023: Dennis King is nominated as the PC candidate for Brackley-Hunter River, and announces that the election will be held on 3 April.

Results

|-
!rowspan="2" colspan="2" align=left|Party
!rowspan="2" align=left|Party leader
!rowspan="2"|Candidates
!colspan="4" align=center|Seats
!colspan="3" style="text-align:center;"|Popular vote
|-
!align="center"|2019
!align="center"|Dissol.
!align="center"|2023
! style="text-align:center;"|Change
! style="text-align:center;"|#
! style="text-align:center;"|%
! style="text-align:center;"|Change

|align=left|Dennis King
|align="right"|27
|align="right"|13
|align="right"|15
|align="right"|
|align="right"| 
|align="right"|
|align="right"|
|align="right"|

|align=left|Peter Bevan-Baker
|align="right"|25
|align="right"|8
|align="right"|8
|align="right"|
|align="right"| 
|align="right"|
|align="right"|
|align="right"|

|align=left|Sharon Cameron
|align="right"|25
|align="right"|6
|align="right"|4
|align="right"|
|align="right"|
|align="right"|
|align="right"|
|align="right"|

|align=left|Michelle Neill 
|align="right"|27
|align="right"|0
|align="right"|0
|align="right"|
|align="right"|
|align="right"|
|align="right"|
|align="right"|

|align=left|Cecile Sly (Ahava Kálnássy de Kálnás) 
|align="right"|11
|align="right"|0
|align="right"|0
|align="right"|
|align="right"|
|align="right"|
|align="right"|
|align="right"|

|colspan="2" align="left"|Independent
|align="right"|4
|align="right"|0
|align="right"|0
|align="right"|
|align="right"|
|align="right"|
|align="right"|
|align="right"|
|-
!colspan="11"|
|-
|colspan="8" align=left|Blank and invalid ballots
|align="right"|
|align="right"|
|align="right"|
|-
| style="text-align:left;" colspan="3"|Total
| style="text-align:right;"| 
| style="text-align:right;"| 
| style="text-align:right;"| 
| style="text-align:right;"| 
| style="text-align:right;"|
| style="text-align:right;"| 
| style="text-align:right;"| 
| style="text-align:right;"|
|-
|colspan="8" align=left|Registered voters / turnout
|align="right"|
|align="right"|
|align="right"|
|}

Incumbent MLAs not seeking re-election
The following MLAs have announced that they would not run in the 2023 provincial election:

Malpeque

|-
|bgcolor="whitesmoke"|19. Borden-Kinkora
|
|Jamie Fox
|
|Matt MacFarlane
|
|
|
|Carole MacFarlane
|
|Paul Smitz
|
|
||
|Jamie Fox
|-
|bgcolor="whitesmoke"|15. Brackley-Hunter River
|
|Dennis King
|
|Greg Bradley
|
|Nicole Ford
|
|Leah-Jane Hayward
|
|
|
|
||
|Dennis King
|-
|bgcolor="whitesmoke"|16. Cornwall-Meadowbank
|
|Mark McLane
|
|Tayte Willows
|
|Don Leary
|
|Larry Hale
|
|
|
|
||
|Mark McLane
|-
|bgcolor="whitesmoke"|20. Kensington-Malpeque
|
|Matthew MacKay
|
|Hunter Guindon
|
|Richard Schroeter
|
|Maggie Larocque
|
|
|
|
||
|Matthew MacKay
|-
|bgcolor="whitesmoke"|17. New Haven-Rocky Point
|
|Donalda Docherty
|
|Peter Bevan-Baker
|
|Sharon Cameron
|
|Douglas Dahn
|
|Neil Emery
|
|
||
|Peter Bevan-Baker 
|-
|bgcolor="whitesmoke"|18. Rustico-Emerald
|
|Brad Trivers
|
|Ranald MacFarlane
|
|Flory Sanderson
|
|David Wilson
|
|
|
|
||
|Brad Trivers
|}

Charlottetown

|-
|bgcolor="whitesmoke"|11. Charlottetown-Belvedere
|
|Susie Dillon
|
|Joanna Morrison
|
|Marcia Carroll
|
|Aidin Mousavian
|
|Jayne McAskill
|
|
|| 
|Hannah Bell†
|-
|bgcolor="whitesmoke"|13. Charlottetown-Brighton
|
|Rob Lantz
|
|Janice Harper
|
|Sandra Sunil
|
|Michelle Neill
|
|
|
|
||
|Ole Hammarlund†(Lost re-nomination)
|-
|bgcolor="whitesmoke"|9. Charlottetown-Hillsborough Park
|
|Natalie Jameson
|
|Adina Nault
|
|Dellon Paul
|
|Tristan Mitchell
|
|Cari Barbour
|
|
||
|Natalie Jameson
|-
|bgcolor="whitesmoke"|12. Charlottetown-Victoria Park
|
|Tim Keizer
|
|Karla Bernard
|
|Barb MacLeod
|
|Joe Byrne
|
|Danni Moher
|
|
|| 
|Karla Bernard
|-
|bgcolor="whitesmoke"|14. Charlottetown-West Royalty
|
|Kristi MacKay
|
|Nick LeClair
|
|Gord McNeilly
|
|Simone Webster
|
|Bill Cann
|
|Jessica Simmonds
|| 
|Gord McNeilly
|-
|bgcolor="whitesmoke"|10. Charlottetown-Winsloe
|
|Zack Bell 
|
|Charles Sanderson
|
|Judy Hughes
|
|Campbell Webster
|
|
|
|Georgina Bassett
|| 
|Zack Bell 
|}

Egmont

|-
|bgcolor="whitesmoke"|26. Alberton-Bloomfield
|
|Ernie Hudson
|
|Ron McConnell
|
|Pat Murphy
|
|Kester Nurse
|
|
|
|
|| 
|Ernie Hudson
|-
|bgcolor="whitesmoke"|24. Evangeline-Miscouche
|
|Gilles Arsenault
|
|Jason Charette
|
|Pat MacLellan
|
|Charles Turriff
|
|
|
|
|| 
|Sonny Gallant†
|-
|bgcolor="whitesmoke"|25. O'Leary-Inverness
|
|Daniel MacDonald
|
|Richard Lush
|
|Robert Henderson
|
|Herb Dickieson
|
|
|
|
|| 
|Robert Henderson
|-
|bgcolor="whitesmoke"|22. Summerside-South Drive
|
|Barb Ramsay
|
|Steve Howard
|
|Nancy Beth Guptill
|
|Kathryn Yule
|
|
|
|
|| 
|Steve Howard
|-
|bgcolor="whitesmoke"|21. Summerside-Wilmot
|
|Tyler DesRoches
|
|Lynne Lund
|
|Don Reid
|
|Cassie MacKay
|
|Eriena O'Reilly
|
|
|| 
|Lynne Lund
|-
|bgcolor="whitesmoke"|27. Tignish-Palmer Road
|
|April Delaney
|
|
|
|Hal Perry
|
|Gail Kinch
|
|
|
|
|| 
|Hal Perry
|-
|bgcolor="whitesmoke"|23. Tyne Valley-Sherbrooke
|
|Hilton MacLellan
|
|Trish Altass
|
|Wayne Cobb
|
|Carol Rybinski
|
|
|
|Wayne Biggar
|| 
|Trish Altass
|}

Opinion polls

Pre-election polls

Voting Intentions in Prince Edward Island since the 2019 Election

The following is a list of scientific opinion polls of published voter intentions.

Notes

References

Opinion poll sources 

Prince Edward Island
2023 in Prince Edward Island
Elections in Prince Edward Island